Ontong Java (or Luangiua, Lord Howe, Luaniua) is a Polynesian language located on the Ontong Java Atoll, also known as the Luangiua Atoll or Lord Howe island, in the Solomon Islands. Two dialects, Luangiua and Pelau, are also spoken on the island. Ontong Java is commonly used by all speakers, young and old. There is approximately 2,370 residents of Ontong Java Atoll and has approximately 2,400 (estimated) speakers living on the atoll.

Classification 
Ontong Java is closely related to the Ellicean languages of Polynesia and to Sikaiana, Takuu, and Nukumanu in Papua New Guinea.

Phonology
The phoneme inventory of this language is poorly studied, and many sources have conflicting phoneme inventories.

Grammar 
Ontong Java word order is normally VSO and SVO.

Notes

References

External links 
 Materials on Ontong Java are included in the open access Arthur Capell collections (AC1 and AC2) held by Paradisec.

Further reading

Ellicean languages